Sivaprasad may refer to:

 Kaviyoor Sivaprasad, Indian film director and screenwriter
 Naramalli Sivaprasad (1951–2019), Indian politician and actor
 Raja Sivaprasad (1823–1895), Indian scholar, linguist, and historian

Hindu given names
Indian masculine given names